San Francisco is a municipality in the El Petén department of Guatemala. The municipality has a population of 8,066 people.

The San Francisco municipal government is led by mayor José Luis Pérez Lara (PP).

The municipality includes 11 communities:
 San Francisco (pop. 2713)
 San Juan de Dios (pop. 1118)
 Santa Cruz (pop. 246)
 Eben Ezer (pop. 229)
 San José Pinares (pop. 203)
 Nuevo San Francisco (pop. 144)
 San Valentín las Flores (pop. 1007)
 Santa Teresa (pop. 101)
 San Martín (pop. 347)
 Laguna El Zapotal (pop. 183)
 Nueva Guatemala (pop. 515)

See also 
 Feast of Saint Francis

References

External links 
 San Francisco, El Petén Official Site (Spanish)

Municipalities of the Petén Department